Józef Pieracki (10 September 1909 - 5 August 1988) was a Polish actor. He appeared in more than seventy films from 1953 to 1986.

Selected filmography

References

External links 

1909 births
1988 deaths
Polish male film actors
Recipient of the Meritorious Activist of Culture badge